The politics of resentment, sometimes called grievance politics, is a form of politics which is based on resentment of some other group of people.

Types

Male 

Male grievance culture is a common feature in mass shooters, according to a study which examined their motivations in the intersection of white entitlement, middle-class instability, and heterosexual masculinity. The study author says that they may be highly motivated by "white male grievance culture".

Female

White 

Columnist Michael Gerson argues that in American politics, the Republican Party  has been "swiftly repositioned as an instrument of white grievance."

Reaction to demographic change 

Demographic change in the United States propelled by immigration has led to an increasing proportion of people with diverse backgrounds, and a decreasing proportion of whites. By 1998, places like Hawaii, Houston, and New York City had no majority race. This trend increased in the 21st century, with several more cities where whites were once the majority, but no longer are. Highly visible advances of certain minorities, such as the first elected black president, and the first Hispanic Supreme Court justice also took place in this period. This caused a backlash among some white Americans who viewed these changes with alarm. In some states, state legislators moved to restrict immigration by law. In the field of education, some white elected officials have moved to restrict diversity programs, or the availability of courses in ethnic studies or the impact of race in America, white others have worked at tightening election regulations in order to make it more difficult for members of ethnic minorities to vote, leading to opposing protests, sometimes clashing, between mostly white groups favoring restrictions on immigration and minorities, and by minority groups seeking to hold on to their rights.

This came to a head during the 2016 presidential election campaign of Donald Trump.

Nationalist
Bart Bonikowski argues that ethno-nationalist populism is often based on stirring up resentment against "elites, immigrants, and ethnic, racial and religious minorities".

Religious

Sexuality and gender

Grievance culture
Jason Manning and Bradley Campbell draw on the work of sociologist Donald Black on conflict and on cross-cultural studies of conflict and morality to argue that the contemporary culture wars resemble tactics described by scholars in which an aggrieved party or group seeks the support of third parties. They argue that grievance-based conflicts have led to large-scale moral change in which an emergent victimhood culture is clashing with and replacing older honor and dignity cultures.
Political commentator E. J. Dionne has written that culture war is an electoral technique to exploit differences and grievances, remarking that the real cultural division is "between those who want to have a culture war and those who don't."

See also 
 Christian nationalism
 Identity politics
 Populism

References

Further reading 

 

 

 

Identity politics
Political terminology